3893 DeLaeter, provisional designation , is an asteroid from the inner regions of the asteroid belt, approximately 12 kilometers in diameter. It was discovered on 20 March 1980, by British astronomer Michael Candy at the Perth Observatory in Bickley, Australia. The asteroid was named after Australian scientist John Robert de Laeter.

Orbit and classification 

DeLaeter is a non-family asteroid of the main belt's background population when applying the Hierarchical Clustering Method to its proper orbital elements. The asteroid has also been considered a dynamical Hungaria asteroid and a member of the stony Phocaea family. It orbits the Sun in the inner main-belt at a distance of 1.8–3.1 AU once every 3 years and 9 months (1,377 days; semi-major axis of 2.42 AU). Its orbit has an eccentricity of 0.26 and an inclination of 23° with respect to the ecliptic.

The body's observation arc begins with a precovery taken at Palomar Observatory in October 1977, or two and a half years prior to its official discovery observation at Bickley.

Physical characteristics 

DeLaeter is an assumed S-type asteroid, which contradicts the low albedo measured by the space-based surveys (see below).

Rotation period 

Photometric observations made by American astronomer Robert Stephens in June 2003 at the Santana Observatory in Rancho Cucamonga, California, gave a synodic rotation period of 13.83 hours and a brightness variation of 0.33 magnitude. In May 2014, a lightcurve obtained by Brian Warner at the Palmer Divide Station gave a divergent period of 5.633 hours with an amplitude of 0.13.

Diameter and albedo 

According to the surveys carried out by the Japanese Akari satellite and the NEOWISE mission of NASA's Wide-field Infrared Survey Explorer, DeLaeter measures between 10.97 and 12.935 kilometers in diameter and its surface has an albedo between 0.0573 and 0.08.

The Collaborative Asteroid Lightcurve Link adopts an albedo of 0.0573 and calculates a diameter of 13.95 kilometers based on an absolute magnitude of 13.0.

Naming 

This minor planet was named after Australian scientist John Robert de Laeter (1933–2010), who was a professor at Curtin University in Western Australia. His research included pioneering application of mass spectrometry and problems in the field of nuclear physics, cosmochemistry, geochronology, isotope geochemistry. He was also a supporter of the Perth Observatory where this asteroid was discovered.

The official naming citation was published by the Minor Planet Center on 28 August 1996.

Notes

References

External links 
 Asteroid Lightcurve Database (LCDB), query form (info )
 Dictionary of Minor Planet Names, Google books
 Asteroids and comets rotation curves, CdR – Observatoire de Genève, Raoul Behrend
 Discovery Circumstances: Numbered Minor Planets (1)-(5000) – Minor Planet Center
 
 

003893
Discoveries by Michael P. Candy
Named minor planets
19800320